Leslie Rupert Hutton (19 November 1906 – 25 March 1987) was an Australian rules footballer who played with South Melbourne in the Victorian Football League (VFL).

Notes

External links 

1906 births
1987 deaths
Australian rules footballers from Victoria (Australia)
Sydney Swans players